Sergio Mendigutxia Iglesias (born 12 June 1993), commonly known by his nickname Mendi, is a Spanish professional footballer who plays as a forward for I-League club Gokulam Kerala.

Club career

Europe

Born in Avilés, Asturias, Mendi began playing as a senior with local CU Collado Villalba in the 2008–09 season, in the Tercera División. In April 2009 he signed with Athletic Bilbao, returning to youth football. Mendi also appeared with the reserves in the 2010–11 season, in the Segunda División B.

After appearing with Athletic's farm team in the 2011–12 season, Mendi suffered a syncope in early April 2012, being sidelined for the rest of the season. He rescinded his link with the Biscay side on 3 November, after failing to appear in 2012–13.

On 30 January 2013 Mendi signed with La Roda CF, in the third level. In July he signed with Córdoba CF, being initially assigned to the reserves also in the third division.

Mendi made his first-team debut on 30 November 2013, playing the entire second half and scoring his club's only of a 1–2 home loss against FC Barcelona B, in the Segunda División. On 11 July of the following year he joined another reserve team, Sporting de Gijón B.

Mendi made his debut for the Rojiblancos' first team on 26 October 2015, coming on as a second-half substitute for Miguel Ángel Guerrero in a 0–3 La Liga away loss against Athletic Bilbao.

NEROCA
On 29 August 2021, Mendi joined I-League club NEROCA on a season-long deal.

On 27 December 2021, he made his debut for the club against Sreenidi Deccan in a 3–2 win, in which he scored a hat-trick.

References

External links

1993 births
Living people
Spanish footballers
Spanish expatriate footballers
Footballers from Asturias
Association football forwards
La Liga players
Segunda División players
Segunda División B players
Tercera División players
I liga players
CU Collado Villalba players
Bilbao Athletic footballers
CD Basconia footballers
Córdoba CF B players
Córdoba CF players
Sporting de Gijón B players
Racing de Ferrol footballers
UD Logroñés players
La Roda CF players
UD San Sebastián de los Reyes players
Stal Mielec players
Marino de Luanco footballers
Expatriate footballers in Poland
Spanish expatriate sportspeople in Poland
Athletic Bilbao footballers
I-League players
Expatriate footballers in India
Spanish expatriate sportspeople in India